The 2019 Rushcliffe Borough Council election took place on 2 May 2019 to elect members of the Rushcliffe Borough Council in England. It was held on the same day as other local elections, as well as parish council elections in the borough.

Summary

Election result

|-

Ward results

Abbey

Bingham East

Bingham West

Bunny

Compton Acres

Cotgrave

Cranmer

Cropwell

East Bridgford

Edwalton

Gamston North

Gamston South

Gotham

Keyworth and Wolds

Lady Bay

Leake

Lutterell

Musters

Nevile and Langar

Radcliffe on Trent

Ruddington

Sutton Bonington

Thoroton

Tollerton

Trent Bridge

By-elections

Musters

References

2019 English local elections
May 2019 events in the United Kingdom
2019
2010s in Nottinghamshire